Qi, meaning air, in traditional Chinese culture, is an active principle forming part of any living thing.

Qi, QI or Q.I. may also refer to:

Arts and media

Television
 QI (Quite Interesting), a British BBC television programme
 Quite Interesting Limited, a company that researches for the QI television series
 QI (Czech TV series), a Czech remake of the British BBC television programme
 QI (Dutch TV series), a Dutch remake of the British BBC television programme

Other media
 "Q.I" (song), a song by Mylène Farmer from Avant que l'ombre...
 QI: The Quest for Intelligence, a book by Kevin Warwick

People
 Qi of Xia, the second king (reigned 2146–2117 BC) of the Xia Dynasty
 Hou Ji, or Qi, an ancestor of the Chinese Zhou dynasty
 Qi (surname), several Chinese surnames

Places

Former states
 Qi (Henan) (杞; 16th century–445 BC) in Henan, the rump state of the Xia dynasty in Henan under the Shang and Zhou
 Qi (state) (齊; 1046–221 BC) in Shandong during the Zhou dynasty
 Qi Kingdom (Han dynasty) (齊; 206–110 BC) during the Han dynasty
 Southern Qi Dynasty (齊; 479–502) during the Southern and Northern Dynasties period
 Northern Qi Dynasty (齊; 550–577) during the Southern and Northern Dynasties period
 Qi (881-884) (齊; 881–884), the short-lived realm of the agrarian rebel Huang Chao during the late Tang 
 Qi (Li Maozhen's state) (岐; 907–924), during the Five Dynasties and Ten Kingdoms period
 Qi Dynasty (937-939) (齊; 937–939), the predecessor of the Southern Tang (937–976) during the Five Dynasties and Ten Kingdoms period
 Qi (齊; 1130–1137),  puppet state of the Jin dynasty (1115–1234) in Central China

Modern places
 Qi County, Kaifeng (杞县), in Henan, China
 Qi County, Hebi (淇县), in Henan, China
 Qi County, Shanxi (祁县), in Jinzhong, Shanxi, China

Science and technology
 Qi (standard), a battery charging interface specification
 Qi hardware, an open-hardware project
 ATCvet code QI Immunologicals, a section of the Anatomical Therapeutic Chemical Classification System for veterinary medicinal products
 QueryInterface, in Microsoft's COM software
 Quote Investigator, a website dedicated to tracking down the origins of common quotations
 Quality Improvement, a formal approach to the analysis of performance and to systematic efforts to improve performance; see Quality Management

Other uses
 Qi Card, an Iraqi national credit card
 Ibom Air (IATA designator QI)
 Qimonda (NYSE stock symbol QI)
 Qualified immunity, a legal doctrine in United States federal law

See also
 KI (disambiguation)
 Key (disambiguation)
 Chi (disambiguation)
 Qizhou (disambiguation)